Max Dauthendey (25 July 1867 – 29 August 1918) was a German author and painter of the impressionist period. He was born in Würzburg and died in Malang. Together with Richard Dehmel and Eduard von Keyserling, he is regarded as one of the most influential authors of that period.
Dauthendey was stranded in Java at the outbreak of World War One. Attempts to provide him with a safe  passage back to Germany failed.

Dauthendey's birth place, where the family lived until 1876, was destroyed during the Bombing of Würzburg in World War II.

See also
 List of German painters

References

External links

 
 
 

1867 births
1918 deaths
19th-century German painters
19th-century German male artists
German male painters
20th-century German painters
20th-century German male artists
German Impressionist painters
Writers from Würzburg
People from the Kingdom of Bavaria
German-language poets
German male poets
Artists from Würzburg